Tim Pocock (born 24 October 1985) is an Australian actor and pianist best known for his role as a teenage Scott Summers in X-Men Origins: Wolverine, as well as Ethan Karamakov in the ABC television series Dance Academy and NBC's  Camp, as Robbie Matthews.

Life and career
Pocock attended Redfield College in Dural in Sydney, Australia. He began his interest in film in 2003, when in Year Twelve he submitted a short film for his Extension II English major work. Pocock started a career in acting despite not having studied drama.

He appeared on the Australian Soap Opera Home and Away in 2011, where playing Angus McCathie.

Pocock came out as gay during an interview on television series Four Corners, which was investigating harmful classroom practices in Australian Opus Dei schools, such as Redfield College.

Filmography

Film

Television

References

External links

1985 births
Living people
21st-century Australian male actors
21st-century Australian male musicians
Australian male television actors
Australian male film actors
Australian LGBT actors
Australian gay actors
Australian pianists
Australian gay musicians
Male actors from Sydney